is the 12th single by GO!GO!7188, released in late 2006, over two years after their previous single, Aoi Kiretsu The single was produced with the help of veteran producer Shigekazu Aida. It reached a top position of 22nd on the Oricon weekly charts.

Track listing

References

2006 singles
GO!GO!7188 songs